The 2013–14 Goa Professional League (also known as the Airtel Goa Pro League for sponsorship reasons) is the 16th season of top-tier football in the Indian state of Goa. It began on 5 August 2013. Salgaocar are the defending champions.

On 20 November 2013, Sporting Clube de Goa were crowned champions after Churchill Brothers failed to report for final round encounter, the title decider against Sporting Clube de Goa, at Duler Stadium, Mapusa.

Sporting Clube reported at the venue as per the fixture and gained a walkover, hence being crowned the champions. The Goa Football Association made no changes to its fixtures even though Churchill Brothers had requested for postponement to the match, citing their I-League engagement against Mohammedan on 24 November 2013.

Teams

Table

Top scorers

References

External links 
Goa Pro League page at Goa Football Association website

Goa Professional League seasons
3